Daniel Griffin may refer to:

Daniel T. Griffin (1911–1941), Aviation Machinist's Mate First Class in U.S. Navy
Daniel J. Griffin (1880–1926), U.S. Representative from New York
Danny Griffin (footballer) (born 1977), Northern Irish footballer
Danny Griffin (soccer) (born 1998), American soccer player
Daniel O. Griffin, Immunologist